Exorista sorbillans, the uzi fly, is a species of bristly fly in the family Tachinidae that is a parasitoid of caterpillars and is a problem for silkworm rearing in tropical regions of South and Southeast Asia.

The species found in India, Exorista bombycis is sometimes synonymised with this species, but is distinct from specimens obtained from the type locality, the Canary Islands.

References

Exoristinae
Diptera of Asia
Insects described in 1830